Noel Baxter (born 25 July 1981) is a Scottish alpine skier from Aviemore. He represented Britain at the 2002 and 2006 Winter Olympics.

Skiing career
He represented Great Britain in 2002 Olympics, coming 21st in the men's slalom.

Despite good form in the 2009-2010 season, he was not picked for the 2010 Winter Olympics in Vancouver. After retiring from competition Baxter became a coach for the Spanish national ski team. he now coaches the British Women's Alpine Team.
  Baxter, as with his brother Alain, also played shinty for Kincraig Camanachd.

Family
He is the half-brother of fellow Alpine skier, Alain Baxter, and a cousin of snowboarder Lesley McKenna.

References

1981 births
Living people
Sportspeople from Edinburgh
People from Badenoch and Strathspey
Alpine skiers at the 2002 Winter Olympics
Alpine skiers at the 2006 Winter Olympics
Olympic alpine skiers of Great Britain
Scottish male alpine skiers
Shinty players
Sportspeople from Highland (council area)
Skiing coaches